Anthony Onomoaso Ikazoboh (died 27 July 1999) was a Nigerian Air Commodore, and former Chairman of the Nigerian Football Association, and Minister of Youths and Sports, Minister of Sports and also Minister of Transport.

He was born in Kano, but hailed from Agenebode in Edo state.

References

Year of birth missing
1999 deaths
Nigerian generals